Carlo Antonio Del Fava (born 1 July 1981) is a South African-born Italian former rugby union player. His preferred position was Lock. After hanging his boots up he then decided to take up coaching.

Del Fava was born in Mthatha, South Africa to Italian parents.

Rugby career
Del Fava made his Italy debut in the 2004 Six Nations Championship. Previously he played for the South African under-21 team.

While playing rugby in South Africa, Del Fava served a two-year ban after testing positive for the banned substance stanozolol.

He was called up to the Italy squad for the 2008 Six Nations Championship.

On 10 February 2014, it was announced Del Fava had been forced to retire due to a long-standing neck injury.

Media work
Del Fava was part of the BBC Sport coverage for the 2014, 2015 and 2016 Six Nations, giving his views on the Italian side.

See also
 Italian South Africans

References

External links
Carlo Antonio del Fava RBS 6 Nations (Archived)
Ulster sign Italian lock Del Fava BBC Sport, 31 March 2007

1981 births
Living people
People from Mthatha
Italian rugby union coaches
South African rugby union coaches
Italian rugby union players
South African rugby union players
South African people of Italian descent
South African emigrants to Italy
Rugby Viadana players
Aironi players
CS Bourgoin-Jallieu players
Ulster Rugby players
Newcastle Falcons players
Rugby union locks
Italy international rugby union players
Doping cases in rugby union
Alumni of Queen's College Boys' High School